62: A Model Kit is a novel by Julio Cortázar published in 1968. It is considered the author's most experimental novel.

Plot

Characters 

Juan, Argentinean interpreter.
Hélène, anesthesiologist living in Paris.
Polanco, Argentinean. Inseparable friend of Calac.
Calac, Argentine writer. Inseparable friend of Polanco.
Tell, Danish.
Marrast, sculptor.
Nicole, illustrator.
Celia, 17-year-old French student.
Austin, young English lutenist; former anonymous neurotic.
Frau Marta, old Viennese lady.
Monsieur Ochs, doll maker.
Harold Haroldson, superintendent of The Courtauld Institute of Art.

References 

1968 Argentine novels
Novels by Julio Cortázar